Grossmont High School is the oldest high school in San Diego's east county, California.  Its mascot is the Foothiller, so chosen because, at the time of the school's construction, east county was much more isolated from the rest of San Diego than it is today and was often referred to as the boondocks or the foothills.  Grossmont is in the Grossmont Union High School District.  The school has an approximate enrollment of 2,800 students.

Grossmont High School has been accredited by the Western Association of Schools and Colleges (WASC) since 1962. The current accreditation is valid through 2020.

Grossmont High School was recognized as being a California Distinguished School for the scholastic year of 2008–2009.

Campus 
The school's "Old Main" building was constructed in 1922 and was used for decades as a teaching space before being converted to district offices. The campus has slowly expanded over the past 80+ years to include thirteen additional permanent instructional, athletic, and administrative buildings. Notable among these is the “Old Gym” which was built in the 1930s by the Civilian Conservation Corps. Recent plans to demolish this gymnasium were tabled after considerable negative community response.

Grossmont is listed as being in El Cajon but is actually right on the border of La Mesa and El Cajon. It is located close to regional Harry Griffen Park. The majority of the student body is from the La Mesa area.

Prop H Construction on the Grossmont High School campus began summer of 2005. The corridors are in the process of being re-modeled. So far the 800, 700, and 500 buildings have been re-modeled and the construction crews are going in reverse order by the building number, 800 first and 100 last. 600 will not be re-modeled as it was re-modeled in 1995, along with the Old Gym. The 400 building or the Old Main building was shut down. Whether the district will re-model this building or demolish it is yet to be decided.

Proposition U passed during the 2008 election by an overwhelming majority. Construction and renovation on the campus will continue.

Future construction
The Grossmont Union High School District plans to first renovate the newer buildings, and have rebuilt the science and Locker Room Buildings. The Science Building Project encompasses designing a two-story science classroom building on the site of the current boy's locker room, shower facilities and weight room.  The design is approximately 17,033 GSF for the Science Building comprising ten (10) classrooms (3 Chemistry; 5 Biology; 2 Physics) and New Restrooms.  The building is designed to the current District Standards as to performance capabilities, and per Education Code and building codes (ADA compliance, Fire Life Safety, Structural). They will then separately, construct a new 9,250 GSF Boys Locker, Showers, Weight Room. The underground utility infrastructure (wet & dry) utilities will removed, rerouted, installed (as required or requested) consistent with the underground utilities water infrastructure plan. Construct a new 9,250 GSF Boys & Girls Locker, Showers, Team Room, which replaced the existing Carl Perkins Building, demolished to make way for the new science building.

Extracurricular activities

Athletics

Grossmont's athletic teams, the Foothillers, compete in the Hills League of the Grossmont Conference and the California Interscholastic Federation (CIF) San Diego Section.

The school fields teams in the following sports: baseball, boys basketball, cheer, girls basketball, boys cross country, girls cross country, football, boys golf, girls golf, gymnastics, boys lacrosse, girls lacrosse, boys soccer, girls soccer, softball, boys swimming & diving, girls swimming & diving, boys tennis, girls tennis, boys track & field, girls track & field, boys volleyball, girls volleyball, boys water polo, girls water polo, and wrestling.

Grossmont's varsity baseball team have captured the division II CIF title in the past 4 seasons ('05, '06, '07, '08) and ranks amongst the most competitive high schools in California.

Grossmont High School's rival is Helix High School. Helix High School and Grossmont High School play for the coveted "musket" trophy in football.

Traditions

Commencement

Commencement at Grossmont used to take place atop nearby Mt. Helix in an amphitheater constructed in the early part of the 20th century for Easter sunrise services.  Graduation ceremonies were later moved to San Diego State University, and then to Grossmont's own Thomas Mullen Adams Stadium (Adams was the first American military officer killed during the Iraq war, and a 1993 graduate).  Awards granted each year at commencement include the Circle G Award, the Boy and Girl of the Year Award, and the Norman Freeman Award.

Notable alumni

 Doug Benson, 1981, comedian
 Gregory R. Bryant, 1968, Rear Admiral, United States Navy
 Jack Hamann, 1972, journalist, CNN, PBS, author "On American Soil"
 Jimmy LaValle, 1996, musician, The Album Leaf.
 David Leisure, 1968, actor, Empty Nest and fictional spokesman Joe Isuzu (Isuzu commercials)
 Beverly Long, 1950, actress Rebel Without A Cause
 Dan McLain aka Country Dick Montana, 1972, musician, entertainer (The Beat Farmers)
 Roger Neill, 1982, composer
 Jack Olsen, 1941, Disney Merchandising Executive, Disney Legend Award Recipient 
 Mark M. Phillips, 1969, astronomer and cosmologist, Gruber Prize Laureate of 2007 for the discovery of Dark Energy and the Accelerating Universe
 Anna Prieto Sandoval, Chairwoman of the Sycuan Band of the Kumeyaay Nation
 William Kennedy Shearer, 1949, attorney, writer and publisher of The California Statesman 1962–2007, founder of California's American Independent Party.
 Julia A. Stewart, 1973, businesswoman, former Chief Executive of Dine Brands Global (IHOP and Applebee's).
 Frank Zappa, 1954, musician, composer

Astronauts
 William Anders, astronaut, Apollo 8, the first crew to fly to and orbit the Moon
 Ellen Ochoa, 1975, astronaut
 Frederick W. Sturckow, 1978, astronaut

Athletes
Joe Musgrove, MLB pitcher, San Diego Padres
 Steven Brault, MLB pitcher, Pittsburgh Pirates
 Kevin Correia, 1998, MLB pitcher, San Diego Padres
 Ralph Drollinger, 1972, UCLA basketball star, NBA player
 Dennis Enarson, 2009, pro BMX rider
 Geoff Geary, 1994, MLB pitcher, Philadelphia Phillies, Houston Astros
 A. J. Griffin, MLB pitcher, Texas Rangers
 Jeff Van Raaphorst, 1982, quarterback Arizona State, 1987 Rose Bowl Player Of The Game
 Grant Roberts, Major League Baseball pitcher, New York Mets
 Brian Sipe, former National Football League quarterback, 1980 MVP, Cleveland Browns and United States Football League (USFL) New Jersey Generals and Jacksonville Bulls
 Barry Zito, Major League Baseball pitcher, Oakland Athletics and San Francisco Giants, 2002 Cy Young Award winner; attended Grossmont High School, University of San Diego High School

See also 
 List of high schools in San Diego County, California

References

External links

 Grossmont High School
 Grossmont High School Class of 1964

High schools in San Diego County, California
Public high schools in California
Education in El Cajon, California
La Mesa, California
Educational institutions established in 1922
1922 establishments in California
Civilian Conservation Corps in California